Eduard Oleksandrovych Piskun (born 1 January 1967) is a former Ukrainian football player.

His son Vladislav Piskun is also a professional footballer.

References

1967 births
Sportspeople from Mariupol
Living people
Soviet footballers
Ukrainian footballers
FC Olympik Kharkiv players
FC CSKA Kyiv players
FC Chayka Sevastopol players
FC Metalurh Zaporizhzhia players
SC Tavriya Simferopol players
FC Naftovyk-Ukrnafta Okhtyrka players
Ukrainian Premier League players
FC KAMAZ Naberezhnye Chelny players
Ukrainian expatriate footballers
Expatriate footballers in Russia
Russian Premier League players
FC Zirka Kropyvnytskyi players
FC Kuban Krasnodar players
FC Nyva Bershad players
FC Nyva Vinnytsia players
FC Elektron Romny players
FC Systema-Boreks Borodianka players
FC Papirnyk Malyn players
Association football defenders